The 1984 Toronto Argonauts finished in first place in the East Division with a 9–6–1 record. They appeared in the East Final.

Offseason

Regular season

Standings

Schedule

Postseason

Awards and honours

1984 CFL All-Stars

References

Toronto Argonauts seasons
1984 Canadian Football League season by team